The 1921–22 season was Real Madrid Club de Fútbol's 20th season in existence. The club played some friendly matches. They also played in the Campeonato Regional Centro (Central Regional Championship) and the Copa del Rey.

Friendlies

Competitions

Overview

Campeonato Regional Centro

League table

Matches

Copa del Rey

Quarterfinals

Semifinals

Notes

References

Real Madrid
Real Madrid CF seasons